Harding of Bristol (c. 1048 – c. 1125) was sheriff reeve of Bristol, with responsibility for managing a manorial estate and perhaps similar duties to those of a magistrate.  He was the son of Eadnoth the Constable, an Anglo-Saxon thane who served as steward to Edward the Confessor and Harold II.  He was the father of Robert Fitzharding who became lord of Berkeley, Gloucestershire.

His wife Livida supposedly died at the manor of Whetonhurst, Blacklow Hundred, Gloucestershire, England in 1101.

References

1040s births
1120s deaths
Anglo-Saxon people
People from Bristol
11th-century English people
12th-century English people
Year of birth uncertain
Year of death uncertain